The Parabounce is a balloon-like apparatus created by Stephen Meadows and patented on December 4, 2001 (U.S. 6,325,329).

Description and operation
The apparatus consists of a gas-filled balloon envelope made from polyurethane-coated material and of a sufficient diameter and volume so that the balloon, when fully inflated and balanced with appropriate weight, almost counteracts the effects of gravity of a pilot. 

The Parabounce incorporates patented features that permit it to be weight balanced and quickly deflated in case of an emergency.

A parachute-style harness secures the pilot to the balloon. By pushing off the ground with his or her legs, the pilot ascends in the balloon to a maximum height of about 120 feet before gradually descending due to the positive weight of the pilot. Optional tether lines held by persons serving as the ground crew prevent the balloon from floating out of control. Once aloft, the pilot can float and glide for distances up to a quarter mile before gradually descending.

In the news
The Parabounce premiered on NBC's Today Show on August 9, 1999. Katie Couric flew the Parabounce a hundred feet above Rockefeller Center.

On February 24, 2002, Five Parabounce units were internally lit and supported acrobats for the closing ceremonies of the Winter Olympics in Salt Lake City, Utah, 

On June 29, 2006, Snapple sponsored Parabounce balloon flights at Bryant Park in New York City  

Parabounce was featured in Inflatable Magazine on June/July 2003 pg 46-47

See also 
Gas Balloon

Footnotes

References 
1. Farnham, Alan (October 18, 1999). 'It's a Bird, It's a Plane, It's...Parabounce?' Forbes Magazine. Retrieved 2012-01-08. 
2. Miller, Martin (August 8, 1999). 'Putting a Bounce in Your Step', Los Angeles Times. Retrieved 2012-01-08. 
3. Gromer, Cliff (September 2000) "One of A Kind" Popular Mechanics Magazine, p. 76. Retrieved 2012-01-08. 
4. "The Light Stuff" Sports Illustrated Magazine, November 11, 1999, p. 39. Retrieved 2012-01-08.
5. Moyer, Glen. "Ballooning's Newest Thrill Ride" January 2000 Ballooning Magazine, pg. 24 bfa.net. Retrieved 2012-01-08. 
6. Los Angeles Times, February 25, 2002, Front Page 
7. Ramirez, Anthony (June 30, 2006) 'For a Spot of Tea, They Offered Balloons on a Cloudy Day', New York Times. Retrieved 2012-01-08.

External links 
 

Balloons